Anderson County is a county in the U.S. state of Tennessee. It is located in the northern part of the state in East Tennessee. As of the 2020 census, its population was 77,123. Its county seat is Clinton. Anderson County is included in the Knoxville, TN Metropolitan Statistical Area.

History
Before the formation of Anderson County, Tennessee, that territory was initially land of what is today called the Eastern Band of Cherokee Indians, which had been settled by several pioneer families including the Wallace, Gibbs, Freels, Frost and Tunnell families.  Although the Treaty of Holston, signed in 1791, was intended as a negotiation with the Cherokee to prohibit settlement of the area including what is today Anderson County, the treaty became ineffective as more settlers moved through the Appalachian Mountains from Virginia and North Carolina into Tennessee.  The flooding of white settlers into the Indian domain was cause for several skirmishes, which eased after the Treaty of Tellico in 1798 (with an origination point for relinquished land from the Cherokee being the Tellico Blockhouse) allowed for greater ease in settling the area.

Anderson County was partitioned from a portion of Grainger County, Tennessee as well as a portion of Knox County, Tennessee, in 1801; neighboring Roane County, Tennessee, was also formed from a portion of Knox County, Tennessee, in 1801, making Anderson and Roane counties effectively called 'sister counties'.  Anderson County was named in honor of Joseph Anderson (1757-1847), who was at that time U.S. senator from Tennessee, and whose career also included judge of the Superior Court of the Territory South of the River Ohio and Comptroller of the U.S. Treasury.

Like many East Tennessee counties, the residents of Anderson County were largely opposed to secession on the eve of the Civil War.  On June 8, 1861, Anderson Countians voted against Tennessee's Ordinance of Secession, 1,278 to 97.

The construction of Norris Dam, the first dam built by the Tennessee Valley Authority, brought major changes to the county in the 1930s. Approximately 2900 families were relocated from reservoir lands in Anderson and nearby counties during the construction, which began in 1933 and was completed in 1936. The town of Norris was initially built as a planned community to house the workers involved in the construction of this dam.  As a result of the dam completion and operation, the temperature of the downstream Clinch River bed changed, so that a former pearl industry which had been successful for many years evaporated as the mussels, once prevalent in the river, were not able to sustain life in the changed climate.

During World War II, the federal government's Manhattan Project brought more change to the county, including the displacement of more families and the founding of Oak Ridge.

The Museum of Appalachia in Norris commemorates pioneer and rural life of past decades in Anderson County and the surrounding region. It is also an antique shop that sells artifacts from the times of the first settlers to the times of the Coal Creek War

Geography

Adjacent counties
Campbell County (north)
Union County (northeast)
Knox County (southeast)
Roane County (southwest)
Morgan County (west)
Scott County (northwest)

National protected area
Manhattan Project National Historical Park (part)

State protected areas
Norris Dam State Park (part)
North Cumberland Wildlife Management Area (part)

Demographics

2020 census

As of the 2020 United States census, there were 77,123 people, 30,175 households, and 19,074 families residing in the county.

2000 census
As of the census of 2000, there were 71,330 people, 29,780 households, and 20,518 families residing in the county. The population density was 211 people per square mile (82/km2). There were 32,451 housing units at an average density of 96 per square mile (37/km2). The racial makeup of the county was 93.36% White, 3.88% Black or African American, 0.32% Native American, 0.83% Asian, 0.01% Pacific Islander, 0.38% from other races, and 1.22% from two or more races. 1.10% of the population were Hispanic or Latino of any race.

According to the 2000 Census the largest ancestry groups in Anderson County were English (37%), Irish (14.7%), German (13.5%), Scots-Irish (4.5%) and Scottish (3.1%).

There were 29,780 households, out of which 29.60% had children under the age of 18 living with them, 53.80% were married couples living together, 11.50% had a female householder with no husband present, and 31.10% were non-families. 27.70% of all households were made up of individuals, and 12.10% had someone living alone who was 65 years of age or older. The average household size was 2.37 and the average family size was 2.88.

In the county, the population was spread out, with 23.20% under the age of 18, 7.50% from 18 to 24, 27.30% from 25 to 44, 25.50% from 45 to 64, and 16.60% who were 65 years of age or older. The median age was 40 years. For every 100 females, there were 91.10 males. For every 100 females age 18 and over, there were 87.40 males.

The median income for a household in the county was $35,483, and the median income for a family was $42,584. Males had a median income of $33,710 versus $23,467 for females. The per capita income for the county was $19,009. About 10.20% of families and 13.10% of the population were below the poverty line, including 18.40% of those under age 18 and 8.80% of those age 65 or over.

Economy
Anderson County has a thriving tourism industry, thanks to major attractions such as Norris Lake, the Museum of Appalachia, and American Museum of Science and Energy, and the county is considered a part of the Norris Highlands.

Communities

Cities
Clinton (county seat)
Norris
Oak Ridge (partial)
Rocky Top (partial)

Town
Oliver Springs (partial)

Census-designated place
Andersonville

Unincorporated communities

Beech Grove
Belmont
Bethel
Braytown
Briceville
Buffalo
Claxton
Devonia
Fork Mountain
Fraterville
Heiskell (partial)
King Arthur Court
Marlow
Medford
Stainville

Politics
Anderson County is a Republican stronghold. The last Democrat to carry this county was Bill Clinton in 1996.

See also
National Register of Historic Places listings in Anderson County, Tennessee

References

External links

 Official site
 Anderson County Chamber of Commerce
 
 Anderson County, TNGenWeb - free genealogy resources for the county
 Anderson county landforms

 
1801 establishments in Tennessee
Knoxville metropolitan area
Populated places established in 1801
East Tennessee
Counties of Appalachia